Maracaju Atlético Clube, commonly known as Maracaju, is a Brazilian football team based in Maracaju Municipality, Mato Grosso do Sul state.

History
The club was founded on 12 October 1986. Maracaju won the Campeonato Sul-Mato-Grossense Second Level in 2004.

Achievements

 Campeonato Sul-Mato-Grossense Second Level:
 Winners (1): 2004

Stadium
Maracaju Atlético Clube play their home games at Estádio Luiz Gonzaga Braga, nicknamed Loucão. The stadium has a maximum capacity of 4,000 people.

References

Association football clubs established in 1986
Football clubs in Mato Grosso do Sul
1986 establishments in Brazil